Xenorhabdus ishibashii  is a bacterium from the genus of Xenorhabdus which has been isolated from the nematode Steinernema aciari collected in the Guangdong Province in China and in Japan.

References

Further reading

External links
Type strain of Xenorhabdus ishibashii at BacDive -  the Bacterial Diversity Metadatabase	

Bacteria described in 2013